Godwin Giles (16 June 1876 — 1 June 1955) was an English cricketer. He was a medium-fast bowler who played for Gloucestershire. He was born in Mere and died in Sunbury-on-Thames.

Giles made a single first-class appearance for the team, during the 1903 season, against Somerset. He scored 8 runs in the first innings in which he batted, and a duck in the second.

Giles bowled nine overs in the match, conceding 31 runs.

External links
Godwin Giles at Cricket Archive 

1876 births
1955 deaths
English cricketers
Gloucestershire cricketers
People from Wiltshire